Concentric objects share the same center or axis.

Concentric may also refer to:

 Concentric muscle contractions
 Concentric (album), a 2010 album byJennifer Gentle
 Concentric Circles (Chris Potter album)
 Concentric Circles (Kenny Barron album)
 Concentric Data Systems, an American software company

See also